Pičín is a municipality and village in Příbram District in the Central Bohemian Region of the Czech Republic. It has about 600 inhabitants.

Etymology
The name Pičín was originally spelled Pěčín and Pěčina. It was derived from the old personal Czech name Pieka, which was derived from pěkný, i.e. "nice".

Geography
It lies in the Brdy Highlands. The southern slopes of the hill are protected as the Kuchyňka Nature Reserve. The village is surrounded by several small ponds.

History
The first written mention of Pičín is from 1289, when the parish church already existed here. A fortress in Pičín was first documented in 1473. The most notable owners of the village were the Bechyně of Lažany family. During their rule, which lasted from 1493 to 1627, they had the fortress rebuilt in the Renaissance style. In 1627, they sold the village to the Dubský family. Jan Ferdinand Dubský founded here a monastery in 1689–1691, but it was abolished in 1786 and later demolished.

Transport
A bus line from Prague to Příbram passes through the municipality.

Sights
The most important monument is the medieval Pičín Fortress, located above the Příkop pond. It was probably founded in the 13th century. In the 18th century, it lost its function of an aristocratic residence and was converted into a granary. Today it is privately owned.

The Church of the Nativity of the Virgin Mary was built in the early Gothic style in the second half of the 13th century. In the mid-18th century, it was modified in the Baroque style and extended. The church is surrounded by a wall and the gate that belonged to the dissolved monastery dates from 1691. In front of the gate are statues of saints Anthony of Padua and John of Nepomuk.

Notable people
Kateřina of Komárov (15??–1534), serial killer; lived and murdered here

References

External links

Villages in Příbram District